HD 125072 is a star in the southern constellation of Centaurus. It is a challenge to view with the naked eye, having an apparent visual magnitude of 6.637. The star is located at a distance of 38.6 light years from the Sun based on parallax. It is drifting closer with a radial velocity of −14.9 km/s. The components of the space velocity for this star are U=−18.5, V=−6.9 and W=−26.9 km/s.

The stellar classification of this star is K3 IV, matching a K-type subgiant that is evolving into a giant. It has 81% of the Sun's mass and 83% of the radius of the Sun. The star is radiating 34.7% of the Sun's luminosity from its photosphere at an effective temperature of 4,858 K. Based on the composition and kinematics of this star, it has an estimated age of about 10 billion years. It is spinning with a projected rotational velocity of 4 km/s.

References

K-type subgiants
Centaurus (constellation)
Durchmusterung objects
0542
125072
069972